James Toohey or Jim Toohey may refer to:

 James Toohey (New South Wales politician) (1850–1895), New South Wales politician and brewer, co-founder of Tooheys Brewery
 Jim Toohey Sr. (1886–1980), Australian rules footballer with Fitzroy and North Fremantle
 Jim Toohey Jr. (1915–2004), Australian rules footballer with Fitzroy and Perth
 Jim Toohey (politician) (1909–1992), Australian senator for South Australia
 James Toohey (prospector) (1827–1883), Irish-Australian land owner of the early colony of Brisbane